Daniel Vladmir Ekedo Chigozirim (born 19 September 1989 in Lagos, Nigeria) is a Nigerian-born naturalized Equatoguinean football midfielder, who is currently a free agent.

Career

Club career
Ekedo played in Equatorial Guinea for Akonangui and Deportivo Mongomo where he was voted player of the season by the national media. He moved to Spain, where he was signed by former Barcelona coach, Sergio Lobera for Segunda División B club San Roque. He played over 40 matches to lead San Roque to their most successful season. In summer 2012, he was transferred to Spanish club AD Ceuta where Sergio Lobera was now the head coach.

The following season, Ekedo was signed by the champions of Morocco, Moghreb Atlético Tetuán. Playing in a central midfield position, Ekedo was named five times in the Botola League, team of the week. However, fiscal problems at Moghreb led to Ekedo leaving the club. He was soon after signed up on a lucrative contract by Al Itihaad in the top flight in Oman.

International career
Like many foreign players who have played or are currently playing in the league of Equatorial Guinea, Ekedo was naturalized in that country and called for the Equatoguinean squad (then coached by Vicente Engonga) that played against Sierra Leone on 8 September 2008, however he did not appear in the match. Ekedo eventually played in a friendly match against Mali on 25 March 2009.

On 8 February 2011, Ekedo scored his first goal with the senior team against Chad.

References

External links
 
 
 
 Fútbol Estadísticas 

1989 births
Living people
Sportspeople from Lagos
Equatoguinean footballers
Equatorial Guinea international footballers
Nigerian footballers
Naturalized citizens of Equatorial Guinea
Nigerian emigrants to Equatorial Guinea
Akonangui FC players
Expatriate footballers in Spain
Expatriate footballers in Morocco
Association football forwards
AD Ceuta footballers
2012 Africa Cup of Nations players
CD San Roque de Lepe footballers
Moghreb Tétouan players
Deportivo Mongomo players